
Gmina Kraszewice is a rural gmina (administrative district) in Ostrzeszów County, Greater Poland Voivodeship, in west-central Poland.

Villages
Gmina Kraszewice contains the villages and settlements of Głuszyna, Jaźwiny, Jelenie, Kraszewice, Kuźnica Grabowska, Mączniki, Racławice and Renta.

Neighbouring gminas
Gmina Kraszewice is bordered by the gminas of Brzeziny, Czajków, Grabów nad Prosną and Sieroszewice.

References
Polish official population figures 2006

Kraszewice
Ostrzeszów County